The 1970–71 Utah Utes men's basketball team represented the University of Utah as a member of the Western Athletic Conference during the 1970–71 men's basketball season. The team finished with an overall record of 15–11 (9–5 WAC).

Schedule

References 

1970–71 Western Athletic Conference men's basketball season
Utah Utes men's basketball seasons
1970 in sports in Utah
1971 in sports in Utah